Anthon is a city in Woodbury County in the U.S. state of Iowa. It is part of the Sioux City, IA–NE–SD Metropolitan Statistical Area. The population was 545 at the 2020 census.

Anthon was home to Charles Osborne, who had the hiccups continuously for 68 years, and was featured in the Guinness Book of World Records. It was also home to eunuchoidal giant Bernard Coyne,  who was over 8 feet (243 cm) tall.

Anthon was named for J. C. Anthon, a railroad engineer. It was founded in 1888.

Geography
Anthon is located at  (42.387737, -95.866362).

The town is situated near the Little Sioux River.

Demographics

2010 census
As of the census of 2010, there were 565 people, 263 households, and 152 families residing in the city. The racial makeup of the city was 97.2% White, 0.2% Native American, 1.4% from other races, and 1.2% from two or more races. Hispanic or Latino of any race were 2.5% of the population.

There were 263 households, of which 25.5% had children under the age of 18 living with them, 46.8% were married couples living together, 8.4% had a female householder with no husband present, 2.7% had a male householder with no wife present, and 42.2% were non-families. 38.4% of all households were made up of individuals, and 23.6% had someone living alone who was 65 years of age or older. The average household size was 2.15 and the average family size was 2.84.

The median age in the city was 46.8 years. 22.3% of residents were under the age of 18; 6% were between the ages of 18 and 24; 18% were from 25 to 44; 26.5% were from 45 to 64; and 27.1% were 65 years of age or older. The gender makeup of the city was 44.8% male and 55.2% female.

2000 census
As of the census of 2000, there were 649 people, 291 households, and 176 families residing in the city. The racial makeup of the city was 99.38% White, 0.31% from other races, and 0.31% from two or more races. Hispanic or Latino of any race were 1.69% of the population.

There were 291 households, out of which 25.8% had children under the age of 18 living with them, 49.1% were married couples living together, 7.2% had a female householder with no husband present, and 39.5% were non-families. 37.1% of all households were made up of individuals, and 24.1% had someone living alone who was 65 years of age or older. The average household size was 2.23 and the average family size was 2.95.

24.8% were under the age of 18, 5.9% from 18 to 24, 22.5% from 25 to 44, 20.5% from 45 to 64, and 26.3% were 65 years of age or older. The median age was 42 years. For every 100 females, there were 82.8 males. For every 100 females age 18 and over, there were 81.4 males.

The median income for a household in the city was $26,364, and the median income for a family was $36,667. Males had a median income of $29,063 versus $19,853 for females. The per capita income for the city was $19,228. About 4.8% of families and 6.9% of the population were below the poverty line, including 2.7% of those under age 18 and 9.4% of those age 65 or over.

Schools

The city is served by the Maple Valley–Anthon–Oto Community School District.

The first school in Anthon was the Fox School, which stood from 1888 to 1890; it was replaced by the Anthon School, which was built in 1890 and 1891 and closed in 1918. A replacement brick building opened in 1918. Anthon won the 1949 Fall Baseball State title. The Anthon and Oto school districts consolidated in 1959 to form the Anthon–Oto Community School District. The Anthon–Oto district began grade-sharing with the Maple Valley Community School District circa 1993, and as part of that arrangement all high school students from both districts attended high school in Mapleton. On July 1, 2012, Anthon–Oto merged with Maple Valley to form the Maple Valley–Anthon–Oto district.

References

External links
 City website

Cities in Woodbury County, Iowa
Cities in Iowa
Sioux City metropolitan area
1888 establishments in Iowa